The Aspeboda Ladies Open was a women's professional golf tournament on the Swedish Golf Tour. It was played annually from the inception of the tour in 1986 until 1997. It was always held at the Falun-Borlänge Golf Club in Aspeboda, Sweden.

In 1986 the tournament was included on the Ladies European Tour and sometimes referred to as the Borlänge Ladies Open. Originally scheduled to return in 1987, the tournament was withdrawn from the 1987 Ladies European Tour schedule and the prize fund dropped from SEK 500,000 to 50,000.

Marie Wennersten, who finished fourth in 1986, won the tournament three consecutive years 1987–1989. Maria Hjorth won the tournament three times in six years 1991–1996.

Winners

References

External links
Ladies European Tour

Former Ladies European Tour events
Swedish Golf Tour (women) events
Golf tournaments in Sweden
Defunct sports competitions in Sweden
Recurring sporting events established in 1986
Recurring sporting events disestablished in 1997